Empress Xiaoyiren (died 24 August 1689), of the Manchu Bordered Yellow Banner Tunggiya clan, was a posthumous name bestowed to the wife and third empress consort of Xuanye, the Kangxi Emperor. She was empress consort of Qing in 1689.

Life

Family background
Empress Xiaoyiren's personal name was not recorded in history. Her family originally belonged to the Han Chinese Plain Blue Banner.

 Father: Guowei (d. 1719), served as a leader of imperial guards, and held the title of a first class duke
 Paternal grandfather: Tulai (1606–1658), served as a first rank military official, and held the title of a first class duke
 Paternal grandmother: Lady Gioro
 Paternal aunt: Empress Xiaokangzhang (1638–1663), the mother of the Kangxi Emperor (1654–1722)
 Mother: Lady Hešeri
 Six brothers
 First younger brother: Yekeshu, father of Shun'anyan
 Second younger brother: Dekesi, served as third class imperial guard
 Third younger brother: Longkodo (d. 1728)
 Fourth younger brother: Hongshan (洪善)
 Fifth younger brother: Qingyuan (庆元)
 Sixth younger brother: Qingfu (庆復; d. 1747), served as first rank military official (pinyin: dutong) from 1727 to 1733, Viceroy of Liangjiang, Viceroy of Yunnan, Viceroy of Liangguang in 1741, a Grand Secretary of Wenhua hall (文华殿大学士)
 Younger sister: Imperial Noble Consort Quehui (1668–1743)

Kangxi era
Lady Tong first entered the Forbidden City in 1676 and became a mistress of the Kangxi Emperor and was treated as a consort, but was not officially entitled. She was first mentioned in official histories on 18 September 1677 when the Kangxi Emperor granted ranks and titles to his consorts. She was granted the title "Noble Consort". As she was the only one among the emperor's consorts to hold that rank, she did not receive an honorary name to distinguish her from the other consorts.

On 18 March 1678, the Kangxi Emperor's second empress consort, Empress Xiaozhaoren, died so there was no one to take charge of the emperor's harem. The Noble Consort was put in charge and became the de facto chief of imperial harem. On 13 December 1678, another concubine of the Kangxi Emperor gave birth to a son, Yinzhen. Traditionally, the Empress was tasked with overseeing the upbringing of all the Emperor's children, regardless of whether or not she was their birth mother. Since the Noble Consort was the most senior among all the Kangxi Emperor's consorts at the time, she was tasked with raising Yinzhen.

On 28 January 1682, the Noble Consort was elevated to "Imperial Noble Consort". On 13 July 1683, she gave birth to the emperor's eighth daughter, who would die prematurely on 6 August 1683.

On 23 August 1689, when the Imperial Noble Consort was critically ill, the Kangxi Emperor officially instated her as empress. She died the next day and was interred in the Jing Mausoleum of the Eastern Qing tombs. She was granted the posthumous title "Empress Xiaoyiren".

Titles
 During the reign of the Shunzhi Emperor (r. 1643–1661) or the Kangxi Emperor (r. 1661–1722):
 Lady Tong
 During the reign of the Kangxi Emperor (r. 1661–1722):
 Noble Consort (from 18 September 1677), third rank consort
 Imperial Noble Consort (from 28 January 1682), second rank consort
 Empress (from 23 August 1689)
 Empress Xiaoyi (from 3 November 1689)
 During the reign of the Yongzheng Emperor (r. 1722–1735):
 Empress Xiaoyiren (from July 1723)

Issue
 As Imperial Noble Consort:
 The Kangxi Emperor's eighth daughter (13 July 1683 – 6 August 1683)
 Miscarriage (August 1689)

In fiction and popular culture
 Portrayed by Ha Chi-chan in The Rise and Fall of Qing Dynasty (1987)
 Portrayed by Zhang Xin in Palace (2011)
 Portrayed by Elaine Yiu in The Life and Times of a Sentinel (2011)

See also
 Ranks of imperial consorts in China#Qing
 Royal and noble ranks of the Qing dynasty

Notes

References
 
 
 

17th-century births
1689 deaths
Xiaoyiren, Empress
Han Chinese Plain Blue Bannermen
17th-century Chinese women
17th-century Chinese people
Consorts of the Kangxi Emperor
Deaths in childbirth